Open Live Writer (also known as OLW) is a free and open-source desktop blogging application released by .NET Foundation. It is a fork of Windows Live Writer 2012 by Microsoft. Open Live Writer features WYSIWYG authoring, photo-publishing and map-publishing functionality, and is currently compatible with WordPress.com, WordPress (hosted), and Blogger, with support for more platforms planned. The application's source code is available on GitHub under the MIT License.

History

Windows Live Writer 
Open Live Writer is a fork of Windows Live Writer, which is based on Onfolio Writer, a product Microsoft obtained from the acquisition of Onfolio in 2006. The Onfolio Writer team worked together with the Windows Live Spaces team to release Windows Live Writer. After the release of Windows 8, Microsoft encouraged the team responsible for the software to focus on Metro-style apps, and the last major version of Windows Live Writer was released in 2012. 

On June 12, 2014, Scott Hanselman announced the idea of making Windows Live Writer open-source. Nearly a year later, it appeared that open-sourcing the program was approved by Microsoft. Later that year, .NET Foundation announced an open-source fork of Windows Live Writer.

Initial announcement 
On December 9, 2015, Scott Hanselman announced the forking of Microsoft's Windows Live Writer as an open-source project called Open Live Writer. The announcement notes that the original Windows Live Writer 2012 application will remain a property of Microsoft and will continue to be offered as part of Windows Essentials while Open Live Writer will be developed independently as a separate project as part of .NET Foundation. A downloadable preview version of the application was offered the same day alongside the full source code on GitHub.

On 27 September 2016, Open Live Writer became available on Windows Store.

Version history

See also 

Desktop Publishing
Content Management System

References

External links 

Blog client software
Formerly proprietary software
Free and open-source software
Microsoft free software
Software using the MIT license
Universal Windows Platform apps
Windows-only free software